Faye Martel Abugan (née Martel; born March 9, 1972) is a Filipino entertainment executive, producer, director, actress, professor, and educational administrator.

Early years and education
Martel graduated from Sacred Heart Academy of Novaliches in 1989 and proceeded to the University of Santo Tomas to pursue a bachelor's degree in communication. She was a member of the Artistang Artlets, the theatre society of the UST Faculty of Arts and Letters. Martel graduated in 1993. She attained her Master of Arts in communication from the Ateneo de Manila University in 2008, and has been admitted to the University of the Philippines Diliman doctorate program with concentration on media studies.

Career
Martel started working in media as road manager for the Filipino hip hop group Masta Plann and as production assistant at the Associated Broadcasting Company (ABC5). She was a longtime faculty adviser of the Tomasian Cable Television and the UST Tiger Radio which operate under the UST Educational Technology Center. The latter was reorganized in 2018 to become the UST Communications Bureau. Martel is the Founding Director of the UST Educational Broadcasting Unit. She is a tenured professor in the University of Santo Tomas, teaching at the UST Faculty of Arts and Letters and at the UST College of Fine Arts and Design  with the rank of Assistant Professor. She is known for teaching courses on television production and theatre arts, and directing shows and events within the said university.

Martel was an Executive Producer for several shows of TV5 Network from 1994 to 2016. She has been involved in several television programs and movies, and was credited as an actress in the 2007 film Tribu by Jim Libiran.

Bibliography
 Toward Cultural Diversity and Symbiosis in Asian Media (2005)
 Asian Media Project for Media Literacy and Cross Cultural Communication in 5 countries (2018)

Select television credits

References 

University of Santo Tomas alumni
1972 births
Living people
Academic staff of the University of Santo Tomas
Kapampangan people
Filipino women academics
Filipino media scholars